Low caffeine coffee is a term that is used by coffee producers to describe coffee that has not been subjected to a process of decaffeination, but is substantially lower in caffeine than average coffee. Samples of coffee vary widely in caffeine levels due to many factors, some well documented (such as genetics) and some not fully understood, such as the action of soil, water levels and sunlight. Low caffeine coffees are typically created by assaying caffeine levels of different bean lots and selecting the best flavor profile from the lots that are naturally lowest in caffeine.

Decaffeination

In the case of decaffeinated coffee, eliminating caffeine can cause a sharp decline in the natural taste of the coffee bean. During the process of decaffeination, the largest coffee producers in the world use a variety of ways to remove caffeine from coffee, often by means of chemical manipulation and the use of potentially harmful chemical components, such as methylene chloride or ethyl acetate. One process that does not use solvents is the patented Swiss Water Process, which relies on soaking beans in a bath which is essentially brewed coffee from unroasted green beans. The caffeine permeates into the bath at a much higher rate than most of the flavor elements. While the process is certified organic, the water solubility of coffee flavor compounds assures that some of the coffee flavor is lost or changed by the bath. The process is more costly than solvent methods, and is performed commercially by only one plant in British Columbia, Canada. Therefore, only  a small percentage of decaffeinated coffee available on the market uses this method.

Risks of caffeine

In large amounts, and especially over extended periods of time, caffeine can lead to a condition known as caffeinism. Caffeinism usually combines caffeine dependency with a wide range of unpleasant physical and mental conditions including nervousness, irritability, anxiety, tremulousness, muscle twitching (hyperreflexia), insomnia, headaches, respiratory alkalosis, and heart palpitations. Furthermore, because caffeine increases the production of stomach acid, high consumption over time may lead to peptic ulcers, erosive esophagitis, and gastroesophageal reflux disease.

There are four caffeine-induced psychiatric disorders recognized by the Diagnostic and Statistical Manual of Mental Disorders, Fourth Edition: caffeine intoxication, caffeine-induced anxiety disorder, caffeine-induced sleep disorder, and caffeine-related disorder not otherwise specified (NOS).

There are also risks associated with consuming caffeine during pregnancy, with studies having shown more than 200 mg of caffeine per day can result in miscarriage.

Naturally low-caffeine coffees
Coffea arabica (common name "Arabica Coffee") is one of the most common varieties of coffee seen on today's market and is widely accessible. However, only a small percentage of coffee consumers know that this coffee type has a naturally lower caffeine count than most other popular coffees. Because Arabica has an approximately 40-50% lower caffeine count than other coffees, the average person can safely consume two cups of non-decaf coffee with the same effect as consuming one cup of a different variety. For more precise measurements of caffeine in common foods and beverages, please reference the table below adapted from USFDA estimates:

Along with Arabica, several coffee producers are now offering options of low-caffeine coffee, which can provide a solution for those who do not want to make the switch to decaf. In nature, coffee grows with varying levels of caffeine. Given various environmental factors, certain beans will grow with more caffeine than others, thereby creating an opportunity to produce naturally low caffeine coffee. Western producers have not yet shown a desire to sort purchased bean lots by caffeine content as a priority. Typically, Asian producers grade individual lots by caffeine level and follow through to roasting in order to standardize caffeine content as one of the criteria for blending.  

There are a few coffea species in which are naturally low to very minimal caffeine.  Many of these species are not in production and have only been identified in the wild as low caffeine levels.  Racemosa Coffee, coming from the distinct species Coffea racemosa has been identified as having a naturally very low level of caffeine.

References

Types of coffee